"Cigarettes & Alcohol" is a song by English rock band Oasis, written by Noel Gallagher. It was released on 10 October 1994 as the fourth and final single from their debut album Definitely Maybe (1994), and their second to enter the UK top ten in the United Kingdom, peaking at number 7 (three places higher than "Live Forever"), eventually spending 79 weeks on the charts. On 13 March 2020, 26 years after release, the song was certified Platinum, indicating 600,000 sales.

Background
Whereas the band's first two singles "Supersonic" and "Shakermaker" had used psychedelic imagery, and the third single "Live Forever" used softer chords and tender lyrics, "Cigarettes & Alcohol" demonstrated the rougher musical attitude that Oasis appeared to be promoting. The song proclaims the inherent appeal of cigarettes, alcohol, and other drugs as a remedy to the banality and seemingly futile nature of working class life. Lines such as "Is it worth the aggravation to find yourself a job when there's nothing worth working for?" taps into a common sentiment of disenchantment in the 1990s. Alan McGee, who discovered the band, boisterously claimed upon first hearing the song that it was "one of the greatest social statements of the past 25 years".

The song was the second case in which Oasis was accused of plagiarism, the first being "Shakermaker". The main riff of the song is lifted from "Get It On" by T. Rex, who themselves took it from "Little Queenie" by Chuck Berry. It also bears a similarity to the opening of Humble Pie's cover of the Eddie Cochran song "C'mon Everybody".

Musical style 
In 2014 book on the album entitled Oasis' Definitely Maybe, Alex Niven typified "Cigarettes & Alcohol" as a "twelve-bar blues rock song" and "a classicist boiling-down of the Rolling Stones' rebel rock archetype".

B-sides
The CD release of the "Cigarettes & Alcohol" single includes three B-sides: a cover version of The Beatles' "I Am the Walrus"; "Listen Up", a six-minute slow rocker musically similar to "Supersonic"; and the popular, slightly punk-styled "Fade Away", whose wistful lyrics are about the destruction of "the dreams we have as children" (this phrase was later used as the title of Noel Gallagher's first live solo album). These three songs were later re-released on The Masterplan (1998), a compilation of b-sides. An acoustic version of "Fade Away" was released on The Help Album (1995), a charity record, and subsequently on the band's 1998 single "Don't Go Away".

Contrary to the track listing and clarified on subsequent releases (including The Masterplan), "I Am the Walrus" was actually not recorded at the Glasgow Cathouse, but at the Gleneagles Hotel during a conference for Sony music executives, who gathered to hear Creation Records' newly signed artists. The song was recorded during soundcheck, in an empty hall, with no audience, at 10 in the morning. Noel Gallagher stated that the band loved this particular live recording, but strongly disliked the event, which Noel described as "one of them shit things where all the twats in suits get together and they roll on the new signings". The band actually did perform the song at the Cathouse in June 1994 during their Definitely Maybe Tour and had a recording of it, "which sounded quite similar but it was fucking rubbish", according to Noel. They then decided to use the recording from the Gleneagles soundcheck, but credited it as stemming from the Cathouse, adding crowd noise taken from a Faces bootleg album to make it sound like an authentic tour recording. "Because it would look shit if you put 'Live at Sony Seminar in Gleneagles'!", Noel stated. "[W]e thought, 'Fuck it, no-one'll fucking know'. But I always meant to set the record straight one day. Sorry to anyone who bought it on the premise of being at that gig."

Covers
"Cigarettes & Alcohol" was covered by Rod Stewart for his 1998 album When We Were the New Boys, on which it is the opening track as "Cigarettes and Alcohol". The song was also performed by the Royal Philharmonic Orchestra on Plays the Music of Oasis, which is part of a series of albums with orchestral interpretations of pop music.

Personnel
 Liam Gallagher – vocals, tambourine
 Noel Gallagher – lead guitar
 Paul Arthurs – rhythm guitar
 Paul McGuigan – bass guitar
 Tony McCarroll – drums

Track listings
 CD (CRESCD 190)
 "Cigarettes & Alcohol" – 4:48
 "I Am the Walrus" (Live at Glasgow Cathouse, June '94) – 8:15 
 "Listen Up" – 6:39
 "Fade Away" – 4:13

 7-inch (CRE 190)
 "Cigarettes & Alcohol" – 4:48
 "I Am the Walrus" (Live at Glasgow Cathouse, June '94) – 8:15 

 12-inch (CRE 190T)
 "Cigarettes & Alcohol" – 4:48
 "I Am the Walrus" (Live at Glasgow Cathouse, June '94) – 8:15 
 "Fade Away" – 4:13

 Cassette (CRECS 190)
 "Cigarettes & Alcohol" – 4:50
 "I Am the Walrus" (Live at Glasgow Cathouse, June '94) – 8:15 

 The song was actually recorded at the Gleneagles Hotel with no audience and has added crowd noise; see "B-sides" paragraph above.

Charts

Weekly charts

Certifications

References

1994 singles
1994 songs
British blues rock songs
Creation Records singles
Glam rock songs
Oasis (band) songs
Song recordings produced by Liam Gallagher
Songs about alcohol
Songs about tobacco
Songs about drugs
Songs written by Noel Gallagher